"Shut Up" is a song written and performed by American R&B singer R. Kelly and included on his twelfth solo studio album Black Panties. Released on November 10, 2011 through YouTube, the song was the first recording he made after throat surgery in 2011.

Background
Following his throat surgery in early 2011, Kelly  went to Twitter to announce his return on December 10 same year with a link of his first song he written after the surgery, "Shut Up". The song is to thank his loyal fans and doctors who helped him though the surgery but also to say "shut up" to people who said his career was over and he was washed up.

Live performance
On December 5, 2013, R. Kelly performed this song for the first time for a live audience on The Arsenio Hall Show.

Reception
Reviews for "Shut Up" were generally positive: Spin wrote, "Kelly taking aim at the haters who said 'he's washed up, he's lost it.' He hasn't. Dude's voice is in prime smooth R&B form".

Lady Gaga encouraged her fans to listen to the song on Twitter and said it empowered her.

Singer Fantasia spoke highly of the song and recommended it to her fans.

K. Michelle made her own version of this song on her mixtape, 0 Fucks Given, released on July 15, 2012.

References

R. Kelly songs
Songs written by R. Kelly	
Song recordings produced by R. Kelly
2013 songs